Sanjeev Kumar is an Indian politician and a member of 17th Legislative Assembly, Uttar Pradesh of India. He represents the Obra (reserved) constituency in Sonbhadra district of Uttar Pradesh. He is a member of the Bharatiya Janata Party.

Political career
Sanjeev Kumar has been an activist of the Bhartiya Janata Party. In the Uttar Pradesh assembly election held in 2017, he defeated his close contestant Ravi Gond from Samajwadi Party with a margin of 44,269 votes.

Posts held

References

Year of birth missing (living people)
Living people
Uttar Pradesh MLAs 2017–2022
People from Sonbhadra district
Bharatiya Janata Party politicians from Uttar Pradesh